Asbjørn Listerud (6 January 1905  –  7 June 1981) was a Norwegian politician for the Liberal Party.

He was born in Vestre Toten.

He served as a deputy representative to the Norwegian Parliament from Østfold during the term 1961–1965 and 1965–1969.

Listerud was a member of Våler municipal council from 1937 to 1975, serving as mayor from 1955 to 1963. From 1955 to 1967 he was also a member of Østfold county council.

References

1905 births
1981 deaths
Liberal Party (Norway) politicians
Mayors of places in Østfold
Deputy members of the Storting
Place of death missing
People from Vestre Toten